The Mount Royal Arena was an indoor arena located in Montreal, Quebec, Canada at the corner of Mount Royal and St. Urbain Street. It was home of the National Hockey League (NHL) Montreal Canadiens from 1920 to 1926, before moving to the then two-year-old Montreal Forum. It had a capacity of 6,000 seated, 10,000 when including standing room. It was a natural ice rink, without machines to freeze the ice mechanically.

It opened, partly unfinished, on January 10, 1920, for a game between the Canadiens and Toronto, won by Montreal 14–7. A week later, parts of a balcony broke before a game with Ottawa, and police stopped sales at 6,500. The rink had been built quickly to house the Canadiens, who had lost their arena, Jubilee Arena, to fire in 1919.

The Canadiens eventually moved from the arena because of its uneven natural ice surface. The team wanted a mechanically frozen ice surface but was never able to get one in the rink, as owner Thomas Duggan concentrated on getting American franchises into the NHL, rather than fulfilling his statements that he would install ice-making equipment in the arena.  

After the Canadiens left, the arena was converted into an auditorium and then into a commercial building. While an auditorium, Enrico Caruso sang there, and Norman Bethune, back from Spain in June of 1937, gave an important speech to rally supporters of the Loyalists. On February 29, 2000, it was destroyed by fire. A Provigo supermarket now stands on the arena's former site.

References

Sources

Defunct indoor arenas in Canada
Defunct indoor ice hockey venues in Canada
Defunct National Hockey League venues
History of Montreal
Sports venues in Montreal
Burned buildings and structures in Canada
Le Plateau-Mont-Royal
Montreal Canadiens